Scoparia basistrigalis is a species of moth of the family Crambidae. It was described by Henry Guard Knaggs in 1866 and it is found in Europe.

The wingspan is 20–23 mm. The moth flies in July depending on the location.

The larvae feed on various mosses, such as Mnium hornum.

External links
"Scoparia basistrigalis Knaggs, 1866". Catalogue of the Lepidoptera of Belgium. Retrieved 9 November 2019.

Scorparia
Moths of Europe
Moths of Asia